The Lijnbaan is the main shopping street of Rotterdam. It was opened in 1953, as the main pedestrian street in the new shopping district, after the old shopping district was completely destroyed during the bombing of Rotterdam by the German Luftwaffe. It was designed by the firm Van den Broek & Bakema led by architects Jo van den Broek and Jacob B. Bakema. It was the first purpose-built pedestrian street in Europe.

Flower beds, benches, statues, aviaries and protective wooden canopies were provided. In spite of the initial fears of shopkeepers, the car-free area proved successful. High-end shops thrived and it became a recreation destination, with visitors from all over the Netherlands.

It is a complete car-free zone and has been a testcase for numerous car-free shopping streets around the world, such as the pedestrianized town center in Stevenage.

However in the 1980s there was a decline as the original shopkeepers retired or left, replaced by large chains. It became a night-time no-go area with shop windows protected by roller shutters. But in the 2010s a revival began, with it becoming a meeting area for more youthful customers.

There are plans to redevelop the street as part of bigger redevelopments of the shopping district. The Beurstraverse (by de Architekten Cie) is an example of these redevelopments.

References

External links

Shopping districts and streets in the Netherlands
Rijksmonuments in Rotterdam
Pedestrian streets in the Netherlands

Streets in Rotterdam